The Romanovs 1613–1918 is a 2016 history book by Simon Sebag Montefiore. The book is about the Romanov Dynasty which lasted from 1613 until the monarchy was abolished in 1917.

See also
Jerusalem: The Biography
Stalin: The Court of the Red Tsar

References

2016 non-fiction books
Alfred A. Knopf books
History books about Russia
Weidenfeld & Nicolson books